Rodney Glasgow Jr. (born 23 October 1992) is an American-British basketball player for the Sheffield Sharks of the British Basketball League (BBL). After graduating from the Virginia Military Institute, he went on to play professionally in Europe.

College career
Glasgow Jr. played college basketball with the Virginia Military Institute Keydets. During his senior year, he averaged 18.8 points, 4.1 rebounds and 5.8 assists per game.

Playing career
Glasgow's first professional stop was with the BBC Monthey in the Swiss Basketball League where he averaged 15.2 points and 4.7 assists per game. The following season he appeared in 19 games for Leuven Bears in the Belgian Pro Basketball League, averaging 11.1 points and 2.5 assists.

From 2017 to 2019, Glasgow Jr. played for BC Prievidza in the Slovak Basketball League.

In 2019, Glasgow Jr. signed with Newcastle Eagles of the British Basketball League. On 15 March 2020, he helped the Eagles win the BBL Trophy after beating Solent Kestrels in the cup final.

In August 2020, Glasgow Jr. signed with Úrvalsdeild karla club Njarðvík. For the season he averaged 13.0 points and team leading 5.2 assists per game, helping Njarðvík rallying at the season end, winning their last three games and staving of relegation.

Personal life
Glasgow's father is from the British Virgin Islands.

References

External links
Profile at Eurobasket.com
Profile Proballers.com
Icelandic statistics at Icelandic Basketball Association
VMI Bio at vmikeydets.com

1992 births
Living people
American expatriate basketball people in Iceland
American men's basketball players
BBC Monthey players
British Basketball League players
British men's basketball players
Leuven Bears players
Newcastle Eagles players
Point guards
Rodney Glasgow
Rodney Glasgow